Adoration of the Magi is a 1650s religious painting by the Italian Baroque artist from Genoa, Bartolomeo Biscaino. It is now in the Musée des Beaux-Arts of Strasbourg, France, for which it was bought in 1878, shortly after the city had decided to rebuild its collections, which had been completely destroyed on 24 August 1870, in the fire of the Aubette during the Siege of Strasbourg. Accordingly, the painting's inventory number is 1.

Until 1959, Adoration of the Magi had been thought to be a work by Valerio Castello (of whom the Strasbourg museum also owns a flamboyant Adoration of the Magi), but the attribution to Biscaino has been confirmed several times since. Although the painter died at a very young age and was only about 22 years old when he painted the Strasbourg canvas, the work is a perfectly achieved example of Ligurian Baroque, blending influences of Parmigianino and Correggio with influences of Rubens and Van Dyck.

References 

Paintings in the collection of the Musée des Beaux-Arts de Strasbourg
1650s paintings
Baroque paintings
Oil on canvas paintings
Italian paintings
Biscaino